Kodungoor Devi Temple is a famous temple located at Kodungoor, Kerala, India. The primary deity of this temple is Kodungooramma. Its antiquity was estimated above 200 years. The temple initially belonged to Madathil family and was later taken up by the Travancore devaswam.

Hindu temples in Kottayam district
Devi temples in Kerala